Asphodelus lusitanicus is a species of asphodel, endemic to the Iberian Peninsula.

Taxonomy
Two varieties are recognised:
Asphodelus lusitanicus var. lusitanicus.
Asphodelus lusitanicus var. ovoideus (Merino) Z.Díaz & Valdés.

References

Asphodeloideae
Flora of Portugal
Flora of Spain